Maene is a surname. Notable people with the surname include:

Edward Maene (1852–1931), Belgian-American architectural sculptor, woodcarver, and cabinetmaker
Stefaan Maene (born 1972), Belgian swimmer